The following lists events that happened during 2017 in Cape Verde.

Incumbents
Presidents: José Ulisses Correia e Silva
Prime Minister: Jorge Carlos Fonseca

Events
August: restructuring of national airline TACV, in cooperation with the Icelandair Group. Binter CV took over inter-island flights

Sports

Sporting Praia won the Cape Verdean Football Championship

References

 
Years of the 21st century in Cape Verde
2010s in Cape Verde
Cape Verde
Cape Verde